Treorchy railway station is a railway station serving the town of Treorchy and  village of Cwmparc in Rhondda Cynon Taf, Wales. It is located on the Rhondda Line.

History
The first station in the town opened as Treorky on 27 September 1869 by the Taff Vale Railway, though the line had existed since 1849. It moved to its current site in 1884, and was renamed to Treorchy in 1904. It was subsequently taken over by the Great Western Railway as part of the Railways Act 1921. In 1948, it became part of British Railways Western Region. The line through the station was reduced to single track on 6 January 1972.

Location and facilities
The station is on the western side of the town, on the road to the village of Cwmparc. There is a single platform, a shelter with seating and help point, and a free car park.

Services
Monday-Saturday, there is a half-hourly service to  Southbound and to  Northbound. There is a two hourly service in each direction on Sundays. In July 2018, previous franchise operator Arriva Trains Wales announced a trial period of extra Sunday services on the Rhondda Line to Cardiff and Barry Island. This was in response to a survey by local AM Leanne Wood and the success of extra Sunday services on the Merthyr Line and the Rhymney Line.

The Rhondda line is planned to be electrified. This would allow journeys from Cardiff to Treorchy to be reduced to 40 minutes, which would help boost the local economy.

Incidents
In January 2007, a boy was killed by an oncoming train at the station, because he was listening to an MP3 player with headphones and did not hear it approaching.

References

External links 

Railway stations in Rhondda Cynon Taf
DfT Category F1 stations
Former Taff Vale Railway stations
Railway stations in Great Britain opened in 1884
Railway stations served by Transport for Wales Rail